An Inaccurate Memoir, also known as Eastern Bandits, is a 2012 Chinese thriller film directed by Yang Shupeng.

Plot
Gao, a Chinese soldier and a bandit member, seeks revenge from the Japanese with the help of bandits.

Cast
Huang Xiaoming as Fang
Zhang Yi as Gao
Zhang Xinyi as Jen (Fang's sister)
Ni Jingyang as Lady Dagger
Wang Lie as Kuei
Tino Bao as Charlatan (an manchu-mongolian bandit.)
Sun Lei as San Pao
Zhang Yue as Lassie
Didi Zhang 
Ma Zhiming

References

Chinese action thriller films
2012 action thriller films
2012 films
Second Sino-Japanese War films